The Charles is a building on the Upper East Side in New York City.

Location
It is located at 1353-1355 1st Avenue on the Upper East Side, in New York City.

History
In 2007, R. Ramin Kamfar, the chief executive of Bluerock Real Estate, purchased the land for development. A high-rise building with thirty-three floors was scheduled for construction. However, the project was postponed due to the Great Recession. Construction began again in February 2013, with only thirty-one floors. It is developed by Bluerock Real Estate, in conjunction with Victor Homes.

Features
The building is a  structure. It is designed in the modernist architectural style by Ismael Levya. The facade is light blue.

Usage
It is a residential building, with twenty-eight full-floor condominiums. The interior design is David Collins.

References

Upper East Side
Residential skyscrapers in Manhattan
Modernist architecture in New York City